Brian Scott (born 9 March 1993) is a retired Irish rugby union player. He played as a prop and represented Dolphin in the All-Ireland League. He was forced to retire from playing rugby due to injury in May 2020.

Early life
Born in Cork, Scott first played rugby at the age of 6 with Dolphin RFC, before moving to Highfield R.F.C. and then Youghal RFC. He attended Presentation Brothers College and represented them in both Junior and Senior Cup rugby, winning the latter in 2010.

Munster
On 3 September 2016, Scott made his competitive debut for Munster when he came on as a substitute against Scarlets in the sides opening 2016–17 Pro12 fixture. On 22 October 2016, Scott came on as a substitute in Munster's 38–17 win against Glasgow Warriors in Round 2 of the 2016–17 European Rugby Champions Cup, a match that was his European debut for the province. On 25 April 2017, it was announced that Scott had been nominated by his teammates for the 2017 John McCarthy Award for Academy Player of the Year, alongside Dan Goggin and Conor Oliver.

On 1 June 2017, it was announced that Scott had been promoted to the senior Munster squad ahead of the 2017–18 season. He signed a two-year full contract with Munster in March 2018, which will commence at the beginning of the 2018–19 season. Scott underwent surgery for a foot injury in December 2018, ruling him out for 4–6 months. However, the persistent foot ligament injury eventually forced Scott to retire from playing rugby in May 2020. He is expected to take up a coaching role with one of Munster's AIL clubs from the 2020–21 season.

References

External links
Munster Profile
Pro14 Profile

U20 Six Nations Profile

Living people
1993 births
People educated at Presentation Brothers College, Cork
Rugby union players from County Cork
Irish rugby union players
Dolphin RFC players
Munster Rugby players
Barbarian F.C. players
Rugby union props